Antonina Matviyenko is a Ukrainian singer. She is known for her timbre of voice and manner of singing.

Biography

Antonina was born on 12 April 1981, in Kyiv, Ukraine. Nina Matviyenko, her mother, who is also a musician and a People's Artist of Ukraine, had a big musical influence on Antonina. In 1991, when Antonina was just ten years old, she went with her mother on a tour of the United States – those were the first performances of her life. In 2010, Antonina completed her studies at the Kyiv University of National Culture and Art and earned two master's degrees in PR Management and in Folk Singing.

At first, Antonina was working in an art gallery, and then in an advertising agency. In 2002, she received The Diploma for the "National Competition of Pop Singing". In 2006, Antonina became a soloist of chamber orchestra "Kyiv Kamerata", where her mother used to perfpr,. After the first audition an artistic director of the ensemble joked: "Matviyenko (Nina) was dismissed – Antonina was accepted". In 2007, she had her first song. In 2011, she took part in the first season of show Holos Krayiny (The Voice of the Country) and reached second place. Matviyenko has about twenty songs in her repertoire.

References

1981 births
Living people
Musicians from Kyiv
21st-century Ukrainian women singers
English-language singers from Ukraine
The Voice of Ukraine contestants